Chandra Devi Dahal (born 26 October 1986 in Morang) is a Nepalese woman footballer who plays for the Nepal APF and the national team.

She represented Nepal at the 2012 SAFF Women's Championship, starting in Nepal's first group game against Pakistan.

Dahal celebrated her birthday just after playing in Nepal's biggest ever win, an 8–0 victory against Kuwait.

References

1986 births
Living people
People from Morang District
Nepalese women's footballers
Nepal women's international footballers
Women's association football goalkeepers